A strongman is a person who performs feats of strength.

Strongman or Strong Man may also refer to:

 Political strongman, a term for an authoritarian political leader, usually head of a military dictatorship
 Strongman game, a physical strength carnival attraction also known as a high striker
 Strongman (comics), a Marvel Comics character
 Jon Andersen (born 1972), professional wrestler also known by the ring names Jon Strongman and Strong Man
 Strongman Mine, a New Zealand coal-mine
 Strong Man, one of The Mighty Heroes in the U.S. animated television series
 The Strong Man, a 1926 American silent film
 Strongman (film), a documentary movie about Stanley Pleskun
 Strongmen, a 2020 book by Ruth Ben-Ghiat
 Strongman (rapper), a Ghanaian rapper

People with the surname
 Steve Strongman, Canadian blues guitarist, singer and songwriter

See also
Strength athletics, also known as Strongman competitions